Daniel "Dee" Snider (born March 15, 1955) is an American singer, songwriter, radio personality, and actor. He was the lead singer and songwriter of the heavy metal band Twisted Sister. He was ranked 83 in the Hit Parader's Top 100 Metal Vocalists of All Time.

Early life
Born in Astoria, Queens, New York City, Snider was raised in nearby Freeport, New York and Baldwin, New York, both on Long Island.  His father, Bob, is a retired New York State Trooper and Nassau County court clerk, and his mother, Marguerite, is a retired art teacher. His father is Jewish, whereas his mother is from a Catholic family of Swiss descent. He is also of Ukrainian descent from his grandfather. Snider and his siblings were raised as Episcopalians after his mother joined the church.

As a child, he sang in a church choir, several school choruses, and concert choir in high school. Snider was also selected for the All-State Chorus for singing.
He graduated from Baldwin Senior High School in 1973.

Career

1970s–1980s
In early 1976, Snider joined Twisted Sister and became the band's sole songwriter. The group released their first studio album, Under the Blade, in September 1982 and developed a following in the UK. Less than a year later, Twisted Sister released their second album, You Can't Stop Rock 'n' Roll. Their third album, Stay Hungry, hit shelves on May 10, 1984. This became the band's most successful record with the hits "We're Not Gonna Take It" and "I Wanna Rock". To emphasize the "twisted sister" image, Snider adopted a trademark persona of metal-inspired drag with long blond curly hair, an excessive amount of eye shadow and rouge, a beauty mark, and bright red lipstick.

During the mid-1980s, before the premiere of Headbangers Ball, the first MTV program to consist entirely of heavy metal videos was Heavy Metal Mania. The first episode aired in June 1985 and was hosted by Snider. It featured metal news, interviews with metal artists, and in-studio co-hosts. That same year, in November, Twisted Sister released Come Out and Play, which sold over 500,000 copies in the US, but was marred by a poor concert tour.

In 1985, Snider was involved in a Senate hearing instigated by the Parents Music Resource Center (PMRC), which sought to introduce a parental warning system that would label all albums containing offensive material. Prior to the PMRC's appearance in Congress, they had singled out a list of songs titled the "Filthy Fifteen" to demonstrate the dangers of such material to youth, with "We're Not Gonna Take It" featuring on the list alongside Prince's "Darling Nikki", Madonna's "Dress You Up", and Venom's "Possessed", among other titles. The PMRC proposed a system involving letters which identified the types of objectionable content to be found in each album (e.g., "O" for occult themes, "X" for sex and profanity, "D/A" for drugs and alcohol, "V" for violence, etc.). Snider, John Denver, and Frank Zappa all testified against censorship and the proposed warning system. Though the system was never implemented, the hearing led to the music industry adopting what is now the generic "Parental Advisory: Explicit Content" label.

The PMRC involved prominent public figures such as Tipper Gore, the wife of Senator Al Gore (D-TN), and Susan Baker, the wife of then-Secretary of State James Baker. Tipper Gore and Snider had a publicly antagonistic relationship as a consequence, with Snider accusing her of having a "dirty mind" for alleging that the lyrics of "Under the Blade" contained sadomasochistic undertones, when they were in fact about medical surgery. Snider also alleged during the Senate hearing that Tipper Gore had fabricated evidence concerning merchandise sold by the band when she stated that "the t-shirts that kids wear" featured "Twisted Sister and a woman in handcuffs sort of spread-eagled". Snider challenged her to produce such a shirt, to which Al Gore clarified that "the word 't-shirts' was in plural, and one of them referred to Twisted Sister and the other referred to a woman in handcuffs".

The fifth Twisted Sister album was Love Is for Suckers (1987). The record was originally planned to have been a Snider solo effort, but Atlantic Records encouraged a release under the Twisted Sister name. Touring lasted only into October 1987, and on October 12, 1987, Snider announced his departure from the band. It was during this time that Snider formed Desperado, a band featuring ex-Iron Maiden drummer Clive Burr, ex-Gillan guitarist Bernie Torme, and bassist Marc Russel. The group's only album, Ace, has never been officially released, but was heavily bootlegged on CD under the title Bloodied But Unbowed.

1990s

In the 1990s, Snider formed Widowmaker with guitarist Al Pitrelli, bassist Marc Russel, and former Twisted Sister drummer Joey Franco. The quartet recorded two albums with limited underground success, titled Blood and Bullets and Stand By for Pain. In the late 1990s, Snider toured with a "self-tribute" band called Dee Snider's SMFs (Sick Mother Fuckers), sometimes featuring ex-Twisted Sister drummer A.J. Pero. The usual lineup included Snider, Derek Tailer, Charlie Mills, Keith Alexander, and Spike.

In 1993, Snider composed the theme song for The Terrible Thunderlizards. By 1994, Snider had, by his own admission: "...lost every penny I made. I was riding a bicycle to a desk job for $200 a week answering phones in an office."

In 1997, Snider began hosting The House of Hair, a syndicated 1980s hard rock/heavy metal radio show on over 200 radio stations across North America. It is syndicated by the United Stations Radio Networks. The show's format runs two or three hours depending on which version of the show a radio station carries and features Snider's closing catchphrase: "If it ain't metal, it's crap!"

In 1998, Snider penned a song entitled "The Magic of Christmas Day (God Bless Us Everyone)", which Celine Dion recorded for her album These Are Special Times. According to Snider, Dion at the time was not aware of who wrote the song. Later that year, he also wrote and starred in the horror film Strangeland. Snider also penned the script to a sequel with the working title of Strangeland: Disciple.

As of January 2008, however, Snider was less than optimistic that Disciple would ever see the light of day, saying in an interview with Bullz-Eye.com that he had reached a point where he should: "...put a sign on my website that says, 'Y'got ten million dollars? Give me a call. I've got the script ready to go. Robert Englund's attached, I'm attached. If somebody's serious and wants to make it, call me. But don't call me 'til you're ready to hand the check over.

In May 2009, Snider revealed on his radio show "The House of Hair" that Strangeland: Rising Sons would go ahead and was set to begin shooting in the fall of 2009 and would be slated for a 2010 release.

Snider indicated in a fall of 2016 interview that Strangeland: Disciple was still not being actively developed.

2000s–present

From June 1999 to August 2003, Snider hosted a morning radio show on a Hartford, Connecticut Clear Channel station, Radio 104 (104.1 FM WMRQ), called Dee Snider Radio. His show returned to the air at night in August 2004 on 93.3 WMMR in Philadelphia, Pennsylvania until June 2005. He fondly referred to his listeners as his "Peeps", and "DEE" euro stickers, printed by the station, could be seen on the bumpers of his fans' cars throughout Connecticut, New York, New Jersey, and Massachusetts. Other members of the morning show included Nick Lentino, Beth Lockwood, "Psycho Dan" Williams, Sean Robbins, and "Darkside Dave" Wallace. He frequently featured high-profile guests, including Ozzy Osbourne, pro wrestler Mick Foley, and Kiss singer/bassist Gene Simmons.

In 2001, Snider was the voice of Gol Acheron, the main villain for the PlayStation 2 video game Jak and Daxter: The Precursor Legacy. The following year, he rejoined with the reunited Twisted Sister. Snider also played himself in the 2002 TV-movie Warning: Parental Advisory. In 2003, he appeared with actor Arnold Schwarzenegger at campaign events during his drive to recall incumbent California Governor Gray Davis. Snider sang the Twisted Sister hit "We're Not Gonna Take It", which was adopted by the Schwarzenegger campaign.

Snider voiced Angry Jack in the episode "Shell Shocked" for the Nickelodeon cartoon SpongeBob SquarePants. He admitted to being a massive fan of the show during an hour-long 10th anniversary documentary of the show in 2009, stating that to be asked to voice a character on the show was an absolute honor. He changed the lyrics of his famous "I Wanna Rock" to "Goofy Goober Rock" for The SpongeBob SquarePants Movie.

Snider has narrated and hosted many shows and specials on VH1, film trailers, behind-the-scenes segments, and DVD special features. He was featured as the "voice" in the bumpers for MSNBC's 2001/2002 "Fiercely Independent" branding campaign.

In 2003, Snider collaborated on a Halloween-themed project called Van Helsing's Curse. The project's first album, Oculus Infernum, was released by Koch Records and featured a blend of heavy metal and orchestral elements in the style of Trans-Siberian Orchestra. The band began touring in 2004 and later released a DVD of the concert entitled Live in Philly '05.

Snider returned to radio in June 2006 with Fangoria Radio on Sirius Satellite Radio channel 102 from 9–12 Eastern.

Snider hosted VH1's 2008 "Aftermath" concert in remembrance of the victims and survivors of the 2003 Station nightclub fire. During the winter of 2008, Snider was featured as a contestant on CMT's Gone Country. The show invited musical celebrities to compete against each other to win the chance to release a country song. In 2008 Snider also appeared on the first episode of Kitchen Nightmares (Season 2), chosen by Gordon Ramsay as part of the marketing for the re-launch of the Handlebar restaurant. On the show, Snider donated a motorcycle on which Handlebar clientele could bid via the restaurant's website.

Snider has hosted Dead Art on Gallery HD, a show about cemeteries' beauty and art.

Snider has also hosted House of Hair, a radio show that plays heavy metal music. Snider has made appearances on the IFC Channel's original series Z Rock as himself playing the character of a "rock guru".

On July 27, 2010, Snider and his family began appearing in the reality television show Growing Up Twisted, airing on the Arts and Entertainment Network.

On October 8, 2010, Snider started an 11-week run in the cast of Rock of Ages as Dennis, the owner of The Bourbon Room, with his official start date being October 11.

In 2011, Snider performed with Ohio-based metalcore band Attack Attack! on stage at the Bamboozle Festival playing their song "Turbo Swag". On the May 15, 2011 episode of The Apprentice, Snider appeared to assist John Rich with his final challenge. He starred in a commercial featuring a mock audition where he came on as himself, and after drinking a soda turns into the lead singer from Twisted Sister (himself). Snider agreed to come because he is personal friends with Rich and wanted to support the charity effort for St. Jude Medical Center.

Snider guest starred in the video for "Immaculate Misconception" by the metalcore band Motionless in White. Snider's son, Cody Blue Snider, directed the video.

Snider and his family appeared on Celebrity Wife Swap January 10, 2012. His wife Suzette traded places with Flavor Flav's long-time fiancée Liz.

On the Valentine's Day 2012 taping of Late Night with Jimmy Fallon, Snider partnered with Donald Trump in a skit based upon the format of the TV game show, Password. On February 19, 2012, Snider began appearing as one of 18 contestants vying to become Trump's next Celebrity Apprentice and was fired after the eighth task during the seventh episode.

In 2012, Snider appeared as the main character of a commercial airing for the company Unibet. The video has been broadcast on commercial Norwegian television from March 5, 2012, through the whole summer. In the spot Snider sings, in his distinctive look as leader of Twisted Sister, a rock song called "Bet", written by Snider himself and composed by the Norwegian heavy metal artist Ronni Le Tekrø.

Snider asked Republican vice presidential running mate Paul Ryan's camp not to play his hit song in their campaign.

On September 6, 2012, Snider performed "We're Not Gonna Take It" on America's Got Talent. Also in 2012, Snider played Larry, the owner of a dive bar in the mockumentary Future Folk about an alien bluegrass band.

On January 24, 2013, at the City National Grove of Anaheim, Snider was honored as roastee at the Revolver Magazine/Guitar World Rock and Roll Roast of Dee Snider.

On November 4, 2014, Snider debuted his original Christmas musical, Dee Snider's Rock and Roll Christmas Tale, at the Broadway Playhouse in Chicago. During the 2015 Christmas season, he took the musical to Toronto.

Snider provided the narration for Attack of Life: The Bang Tango Movie, which is a documentary film directed by Drew Fortier about the 1980s hard rock band Bang Tango.

On May 27, 2021, Snider announced his new upcoming solo album Leave A Scar. He also released the single "I Gotta Rock (Again)" which he described as the "driving motivation" and "starting gun for this album". Leave A Scar will be produced by Jamey Jasta, the lead singer of the band Hatebreed, with mixing and mastering done by Nick Bellmore. The album features guest appearances by Cannibal Corpse's singer Corpsegrinder on the track "Time To Choose". Music videos were released for the songs "I Gotta Rock (Again)", "Down But Never Out", and "Time To Choose". The album was released on July 30, 2021.

Uses of "We're Not Gonna Take It" 

On July 11, 2013, after abortion rights activists sang "We're Not Gonna Take It" to protest abortion restrictions in Texas, Snider tweeted that he is "pro-choice", and that he did not believe that being Christian and "pro-choice" were mutually exclusive.

In the wake of teachers' strikes in West Virginia and Oklahoma, Snider dedicated "We're Not Gonna Take It" to teachers during his "Rocktopia" performance at the Broadway Theatre in New York on April 9, 2018. The song had become an anthem for protesting teachers in West Virginia, Kentucky, Oklahoma and elsewhere, and Snider had tweeted his "support [of the] underpaid teacher's cause" after seeing a video of music teachers in Oklahoma performing the song.

In 2021, Snider objected to the use of the song by demonstrators in Fort Lauderdale protesting face masks during the COVID-19 pandemic in the United States. During the 2022 Russian invasion of Ukraine, Snider approved the use of "We're Not Gonna Take It" by the Ukrainians.

Personal life
Snider has been married to his wife Suzette, a costume designer, since 1981. They have four children, Jesse Blaze Snider (born September 19, 1982), Shane Royal Snider (born February 29, 1988), Cody Blue Snider (born December 7, 1989), and Cheyenne Jean Snider (born October 31, 1996) who was in the band They All Float. He also has four grandchildren.

In the 1985 Parents Music Resource Center (PMRC) Senate hearings, Snider stated: "I was born and raised a Christian, and I still adhere to those principles."

In 2003, Snider's brother-in-law, Vincent Gargiulo, was murdered. The killer was apprehended in 2009.

Snider lived part-time in East Setauket, New York. He appeared on MTV Cribs in 2005 to show his Long Island home, along with two of his four children, Shane and Cheyenne.

In 2008, he stated in a TMZ interview that he would be voting for Barack Obama because John McCain (whom he liked and supported for many years) would not acknowledge the mistakes George W. Bush had made while in office.

Projects

Books 
In 1987, Snider and co-author Philip Bashe published Dee Snider's Teenage Survival Guide, a self-help manual for adolescence. His autobiography, Shut up and give me the mic, was published in 2012. He wrote We're Not Gonna Take It, a children's book illustrated by Margaret McCartney, which was published in 2020. In 2022, a graphic novel collaboration between Snider, writer Frank Marraffino, and artist Steve Kurth, was announced by Z2 Comics, scheduled for publication in 2023.

Bands
 Twisted Sister (Disbanded 2016)
 Desperado
 Widowmaker
 Bent Brother (Twisted Sister occasionally made small tours around the world, in full makeup, and previous to those performances, performed as Bent Brother, practicing their set and appearing without makeup, usually at reduced ticket prices)

Discography

Solo albums
 Never Let the Bastards Wear You Down (2000)
 Dee Does Broadway (2012)
 We Are the Ones (2016)
 For the Love of Metal (2018)
 Leave a Scar (2021)

Guest appearances
 "Eleanor Rigby" on Eddie Ojeda's Axes 2 Axes, 2005
 "SCG3 Special Report" on Lordi: The Arockalypse, 2006
 "The Haunting" on Ghostlights, by Avantasia, 2016
 "Contract Song" on XXX : 30 Years in Metal by Hansen, 2016
"True Rocker" on True Rockers by Monster Truck, 2018
 "These Old Boots" on Old Lions Still Roar by Phil Campbell, 2019
 ”Get Out! Now!” on Transitus by Ayreon, 2020

Tribute albums
 "Crazy Train" on Bat Head Soup: A Tribute to Ozzy, 2000
 "Go to Hell" on Humanary Stew: A Tribute To Alice Cooper, 1999
 "Go to Hell" on Welcome to My Nightmare: An All-Star Salute To Alice Cooper, 1999
 "Detroit Rock City" on Spin The Bottle: An All-Star Tribute To KISS, 2004
 "Wasted Years" on Numbers From The Beast : An All Star Tribute to Iron Maiden, 2005
 "Paint it Black" on Harder & Heavier-60's British Invasion Goes Metal, 2010
 "It Was a Very Good Year" on Sin-Atra, 2011
 "Walk All Over You" on Remixed to Hell: A Tribute to AC/DC

Soundtracks
 "Inconclusion" from Strangeland soundtrack (1998)

Other works

TV appearances
 "Saigon Suicide Show"; an episode of the television show The Upright Citizens Brigade, 1998
 "Handlebar"; an episode of the television show Kitchen Nightmares, 2008
 "Episode#1.7"; an episode of the television show Z Rock (ZO2), 2008
 Monster Circus live at the Las Vegas Hilton March 19–21 and 26–28, 2009
 "I Wanna Rock" on America's Got Talent, 2010
 Celebrity Apprentice May 15, 2011
 VH1's I love the... series, 2002–2004
 Appeared on Chappelle's Show on Comedy Central, season 1 episode 6 as part of the "Ask a Gay Dude – with Mario Cantone " skit; aired February 26, 2003
 RadioShack: "The '80s Called" (2014)
 Counting Cars (2016–2017) – appeared in person in three episodes
 AXS TVs Top Ten Revealed, (2018–present)
 Cobra Kai (2021) - Appeared as himself at a concert two of the characters visit. He performs "I Wanna Rock".
 Celebrity Family Feud (2021)

Radio appearances
 "Howard Stern" on Sirius, February 8, 2006; 2007
 Penn Radio (October 19, 2006) – interviewed by Penn Jillette

Filmography
 Pee-wee's Big Adventure (1985) – cameo appearance filming a video for "Burn in Hell"
 Private Parts (1997) – cameo appearance backstage at the 1992 MTV Music Awards
 Strangeland (1998)
 Warning: Parental Advisory (2002)
 Van Helsing's Curse (2004)
 Kiss Loves You (2004)
 Metal: A Headbanger's Journey (2005)
 The Celebrity Apprentice 5 (2012)
 The History of Future Folk (2012)
 Rock and Roll Roast of Dee Snider (2013)
 The Celebrity Apprentice 6 (2013)
 Holliston (series; 2013–2018)
 The Last Sharknado: It's About Time as Sheriff (2018)

Voice-over work
 Motorcity (2012) – The Duke of Detroit
 "Street Monkeys," SNI/SI Networks L.L.C (2011) – narrator
 SpongeBob SquarePants (2009) – played the character Angry Jack in the episode "Shell Shocked" though his name is misspelled in the credits (coincidentally, Twisted Sister's song "I Wanna Rock" was spoofed in The SpongeBob SquarePants Movie).
 Jak and Daxter: The Precursor Legacy (2001) – voice of Gol Acheron
 Secret Mountain Fort Awesome – voice of the Tooth Fairy

Bibliography 

Dee Snider's Teenage Survival Guide with Philip Bashe, 1987, Dolphin/Doubleday 
Shut Up and Give Me the Mic: a twisted memoir, 2012, Gallery Books
We're Not Gonna Take It: A Children's Picture Book, 2020, Akashic Books
Dee Snider: He's Not Gonna Take It with Frank Marraffino and Steve Kurth, 2023, Z2 Comics

References

External links
 
 
 Meet the Snider Family on VH1 – official VH1 site
 Dee Snider radio talk show
 Dee Snider - Wikipedia: Fact or Fiction? at Loudwire

1955 births
American Christians
American heavy metal singers
20th-century American male singers
20th-century American singers
21st-century American male singers
21st-century American singers
American people of Jewish descent
American people of Swiss descent
American people of Ukrainian descent
Jewish heavy metal musicians
American radio personalities
Articles containing video clips
Living people
Participants in American reality television series
People from Astoria, Queens
People from Baldwin, Nassau County, New York
People from East Setauket, New York
Singers from New York (state)
The Apprentice (franchise) contestants
Twisted Sister members
American abortion-rights activists
Napalm Records artists